Liu Cheng-chuan (Traditional Chinese:劉峻銓) is a Taiwanese professional pool player. He was still active in the 2006 WPA Men's World Nine-ball Championship.  He was eventually eliminated by runner-up Ralf Souquet in the quarter-finals.  Nevertheless, his performance secured him a spot in the 2007 edition of the tournament.

References

Living people
Year of birth missing (living people)
Taiwanese pool players
Place of birth missing (living people)